A sopaipilla, sopapilla, sopaipa, or cachanga is a kind of fried pastry and a type of quick bread served in several regions with Spanish heritage in the Americas. The word sopaipilla is the diminutive of sopaipa, a word that entered Spanish from the Mozarabic language of Al-Andalus. The original Mozarabic word Xopaipa was used to mean bread soaked in oil. The word is derived in turn from the Germanic word suppa, which meant bread soaked in liquid.

A sopaipilla is traditionally made from leavened wheat dough (or a mixture of wheat flour and masa harina) to which some shortening such as butter is added. After being allowed to rise, the dough is rolled into a sheet that is then cut into circular, square or triangular shapes, 8–10 cm in size for the longest dimension (if intended for a dessert) or 15–20 cm (if intended to be stuffed for a main course). These pieces are then deep-fried in oil, sometimes after being allowed to rise further before frying: the frying causes them to puff up, ideally forming a hollow pocket in the center.

History

Fried cakes have been made by humans since the earliest pottery vessels were developed that could hold oil or fat, around 5000 to 3000 BCE. In ancient times, frying cakes was a primitive substitute for baking, requiring only fire and a simple vessel. Every culture has developed some form of the dish. Sopaipilla is a version found in Latin American cuisine, Tex-Mex cuisine and the cuisine of the Southwestern United States.

Variations

There are yeasted and quick bread variations of sopaipillas. Some batters are enriched by the addition of pumpkin.

Argentina

In Argentina, this pastry is known under other names apart from sopaipa, supaipa and sopaipilla including torta frita, kreppel (from regional German Kreppel), and chipá cuerito.

Chile

In Chile, sopaipillas (or sopaipas) are known to have been eaten at least since 1726. Although traditional Chilean sopaipillas made in central Chile include cooked ground pumpkin in their dough, this is typically not the case in the south. Depending if they are served as a pastry or bread Chilean sopaipillas are traditionally served with either pebre (a sauce of chili pepper, onion, garlic and coriander) or boiled in chancaca sauce (a homemade hot syrup cooked with panela, orange peel and cinnamon, and then they are called sopaipillas pasadas). They are also served with mustard, ketchup, hot butter, avocado or cheese. In Chile sopaipillas are traditionally homemade and eaten during days of heavy rain, as well as enjoying widespread popularity as street food, especially during winter. Chilean sopaipillas are round and flat, sporting holes pricked through the centre of the dough, usually by a fork.

From Chiloé Archipelago to the south, sopaipillas have rhomboid form. They are a relevant ingredient in reitimientos, a traditional feast related to rendering fats after a pig slaughter.

Peru
In Peru, the name for this fried pastry is cachanga, and it may be either sweet or sour. Generally prepared during breakfast time, this traditional food of the Peruvian cuisine is prepared differently depending on the region, with one of the recipes involving the usage of cinnamon. The main difference between this form of sopaipilla and the other versions is that they are larger, thinner, and more rigid.

United States

Sopaipillas in New Mexican cuisine are pillow-shaped fried pastry dough, distinct from  Latin American variations. Similar to Native American frybread, they are typically served as a bread, and used to mop up sauces, scoop up tidbits, dab up flavors, or are shredded into stews. It has been called "the doughnut of the Southwest", while other authors have said "this non-yeasted, simply flavored bread is definitely not a donut, but it's not really a fritter either".

In New Mexico, they are often filled with savory ingredients such as ground beef or chicken, covered with chile and cheese, and served with lettuce and tomato as an entree.  They are also eaten as a dessert, drizzled with honey or anise syrup.

Sopaipillas in Tex-Mex cuisine are a puffed pastry, but otherwise similar to New Mexican-style sopaipillas, except that they are always served as a dessert item, coated with cinnamon sugar and served with honey. Many Tex-Mex restaurants in Texas and Oklahoma will serve dessert sopaipillas as part of the complimentary "set-up": chips and salsa served before the meal, along with sometimes queso sauce, pickled vegetables and flour tortillas and sopaipillas served at the end of the meal.

Sopaipilla and strudel were together designated as Texas' state pastries from 2003 to 2005.

Uruguay
In Uruguay, a variant of the sopaipilla is known as torta frita. Tortas fritas are made of flour, salt and water and shortened with cow fat, stretched into a thin large shaped dough (20-25 cm) and deep fried in cow fat. They are usually salty, but it is a common custom to cover them with sugar or quince cheese and eat them as a snack.
They are commonly prepared on rainy days.

See also

 Buñuelo
Fry bread
 List of quick breads
 List of doughnut varieties
 List of fried dough varieties
 Dessert chimichangas

Notes

References

Further reading

External links
 "sopaipilla", Webster's New World College Dictionary
 Chilean-Style Sopapillas, or Pumpkin Fritters  from The Spruce Eats
 How to Make New Mexico Style Sopaipillas

American doughnuts
Argentine cuisine
Bolivian cuisine
Chilean breads
Cuisine of the Southwestern United States
Doughnuts
New Mexican cuisine
Peruvian cuisine
Quick breads
Tex-Mex cuisine
Uruguayan cuisine
Mexican desserts
Mexican cuisine
Mexican breads